François Lecat (born 19 April 1993) is a Belgian male volleyball player. He is part of the Belgium men's national volleyball team. He competed at the 2015 European Games in Baku. On club level he plays for BluVolley Verona.

References

External links
 François Lecat at the International Volleyball Federation
 

1993 births
Living people
Belgian men's volleyball players
Volleyball players at the 2015 European Games
European Games competitors for Belgium
Place of birth missing (living people)
Belgian expatriates in Italy
Expatriate volleyball players in Italy
Blu Volley Verona players